(May 13, 2004 - ) is a retired Japanese racehorse which won the 2007 Oka Sho, Shūka Sho, Queen Elizabeth II Commemorative Cup and the 2008 Arima Kinen.

Pedigree

References

2004 racehorse births
Racehorses bred in Japan
Racehorses trained in Japan
Thoroughbred family 4-d